(also known as GunForce: Battle Fire Engulfed Terror Island) is a side-scrolling run and gun video game produced by Irem for arcades in 1991. The game was ported by Bits Studios and published by Irem for the Super Nintendo Entertainment System in 1992. The sequel, GunForce II, was originally known in Japan as Geo Storm.

Gameplay

The player is armed with a gun that fires rapid-fire bullets. Each direction it shoots can be fixed toward it so the player doesn't have to hold the joystick toward it. Players may find motorcycles to speed across enemy territory faster in addition to helicopters and cable cars.

After scoring over any high score, whether they win or lose, players can enter their name into the high score list after the game over screen is "achieved". A strict time limit keeps the game going at a steady pace throughout; the consequence involves losing a life.

Plot

Parachuted out of a bomber, the player has landed into hostile territory to defeat the enemy who is threatening Mother Earth.

Release

Reception 

In Japan, Game Machine listed GunForce on their July 1, 1991 issue as being the tenth most-successful table arcade unit of the month. In the September 1991 issue of Japanese publication Micom BASIC Magazine, the game was ranked on the number fifteen spot in popularity.

References

External links 
 GunForce at GameFAQs
 GunForce at Giant Bomb
 GunForce at Killer List of Videogames
 GunForce at MobyGames

1991 video games
Arcade video games
Irem games
Multiplayer and single-player video games
Run and gun games
Science fiction video games
Super Nintendo Entertainment System games
Video games developed in Japan
Video games set in 2000
Cooperative video games
Bits Studios games